Peter Struhár (born 17 January 1984) is a Slovak professional football manager and former player, who is the head coach of MFK Ružomberok

Struhár played for Czech football team 1. FC Slovácko.

Honours

Ružomberok
Slovak Super Liga Runners-up (1): 2021–22

References

External links 

HLSZ 

1984 births
Living people
Footballers from Bratislava
Slovak footballers
Association football defenders
ŠK Slovan Bratislava players
FC Petržalka players
1. FC Slovácko players
Nyíregyháza Spartacus FC players
FC DAC 1904 Dunajská Streda players
Kapfenberger SV players
FC Nitra players
Lombard-Pápa TFC footballers
Slovak Super Liga players
Austrian Football Bundesliga players
Nemzeti Bajnokság I players
Slovak expatriate footballers
Expatriate footballers in the Czech Republic
Expatriate footballers in Hungary
Expatriate footballers in Austria
Slovak expatriate sportspeople in the Czech Republic
Slovak expatriate sportspeople in Hungary
Slovak expatriate sportspeople in Austria
MFK Ružomberok managers
Slovak football managers